Ahmed Mamsa (15 January 1919 – 14 November 2005) was an Indian cricket umpire. He stood in six Test matches between 1964 and 1973.

See also
 List of Test cricket umpires

References

1919 births
2005 deaths
Sportspeople from Yangon
Indian Test cricket umpires